David William Power (14 July 1928 – 1 February 2014) was an Australian athlete who competed mainly in the 10,000 metres during his career.

Born in Maitland, New South Wales, he competed for Australia in the 1956 Summer Olympics in Melbourne and the 1960 Summer Olympics held in Rome, Italy in the 10,000 metres where he won the Bronze medal.

Quote by Herb Elliott, “Dave Power . . . is perhaps the most lion-hearted  athlete I’ve known . . . "   Website Racing Past says, "One of the greatest Australian runners between 1958 and 1962."  Power won two gold medals at the 1958 British Empire and Commonwealth Games in Cardiff, Wales in the 6 mile and marathon races, and collected two silver medals in the same events at the 1962 British Empire and Commonwealth Games in Perth, Western Australia. At various periods of his career he was coached by Arthur Lydiard and Percy Cerutty, among others. He was inducted into the Sport Australia Hall of Fame in 1999.

References

External links
 
 
 

1928 births
2014 deaths
Australian male long-distance runners
Commonwealth Games gold medallists for Australia
Commonwealth Games silver medallists for Australia
Olympic bronze medalists for Australia
Athletes (track and field) at the 1956 Summer Olympics
Athletes (track and field) at the 1960 Summer Olympics
Olympic athletes of Australia
Athletes (track and field) at the 1958 British Empire and Commonwealth Games
Athletes (track and field) at the 1962 British Empire and Commonwealth Games
Commonwealth Games medallists in athletics
Sport Australia Hall of Fame inductees
Medalists at the 1960 Summer Olympics
Olympic bronze medalists in athletics (track and field)
People from Maitland, New South Wales
Sportsmen from New South Wales
20th-century Australian people
Medallists at the 1958 British Empire and Commonwealth Games